Calothamnus phellosus is a plant in the myrtle family, Myrtaceae and is endemic to the south-west of Western Australia. It is a tall, spreading shrub with needle-shaped, prickly leaves and bright red flowers with five stamen bundles. (In 2014 Craven, Edwards and Cowley proposed that the species be renamed Melaleuca phellosa.)

Description

The flowers have 5 sepals and 5 petals.

Taxonomy and naming
Calothamnus phellosus was first formally described in 2010 by Alex George in Nuytsia from a specimen found in the north of the Murchison River near Eurardy. The specific epithet (phellosus) is said to be Greek, meaning "corky", referring to the outer surface of the fruit of this species. In ancient Greek phellosus is not attested.
The suffix -osus is not of Greek but of Latin origin. In ancient Greek, phellos (φελλός) is used for "cork" and phellōdēs (φελλώδης) and phellinos (φέλλινος) mean respectively "of cork" and "made of cork".

Distribution and habitat
Calothamnus phellosus occurs in the Avon Wheatbelt, Geraldton Sandplains and Yalgoo biogeographic regions.

Conservation
Calothamnus phellosus is classified as "not threatened" by the Western Australian government department of parks and wildlife.

References

phellosus
Myrtales of Australia
Plants described in 2010
Endemic flora of Western Australia